Ələzəpin is a village in the Lankaran Rayon of Azerbaijan.  The village forms part of the municipality of Biləsər.

The village hosts several endangered native plant species.

References 

Populated places in Lankaran District